Kronotsky (Kronotskaya Sopka) is a major stratovolcano on the Kamchatka Peninsula, Russia. It is located in Kronotsky Nature Reserve to the east of Lake Kronotskoye (the largest lake in Kamchatka). It has a particularly symmetrical conical shape, comparable to Mount Fuji in Japan and to Mayon Volcano in the Philippines. The summit crater is plugged by a volcanic neck, and the summit itself is ice-capped. It exhibits the classic radial drainage pattern, extending downward from its crater. Kronotsky is considered to be one of the most scenic volcanoes in Kamchatka. In the 20th century, the volcano had low activity, with occasional weak phreatic eruptions.

See also
 Kronotsky Nature Reserve
 List of ultras of Northeast Asia
 List of volcanoes in Russia

References

External links
 "Kronotsky Volcano, Kamchatka" Oregonstate.edu.

Volcanoes of the Kamchatka Peninsula
Mountains of the Kamchatka Peninsula
Biosphere reserves of Russia
Stratovolcanoes of Russia
Pleistocene stratovolcanoes
Holocene stratovolcanoes